Ohio Street Bridge, also known as the Joan Marchand Overlook, is a historic Pratt through Truss bridge located at Evansville, Indiana. It was built in 1891 by the Pittsburgh Bridge Company and the sandstone abutments constructed by Eigenmann & Hoolerbach. It is a single span steel truss bridge and measures 198 feet long and 24 feet wide.  It is closed to vehicular traffic but is used by pedestrian traffic.

It was added to the National Register of Historic Places in 1998.

References

Road bridges on the National Register of Historic Places in Indiana
Bridges completed in 1891
Buildings and structures in Evansville, Indiana
National Register of Historic Places in Evansville, Indiana
Steel bridges in the United States
Pratt truss bridges in the United States
Transportation buildings and structures in Vanderburgh County, Indiana